Orjola Pampuri is an Albanian psychologist and starting from September 2017, she will be representing the Democratic Party of Albania in the Parliament of Albania.

She was born on 13 November 1981 in Tirana and she and graduated from the University of Tirana in Psychology. She later finished her PhD studies there.

After the 2017 Parliamentary elections she was elected for the Democratic Party at the Albanian Parliament representing Tirana county.

She is the niece of Ymer Pampuri, an Albanian weightlifter who in the 1972 Summer Olympic Games became the first Albanian to break an Olympic record.

References

Living people
1981 births
Democratic Party of Albania politicians
University of Tirana alumni
21st-century Albanian politicians
21st-century Albanian women politicians
Members of the Parliament of Albania
Women members of the Parliament of Albania